Nathaniel Charles Comfort is an American historian specializing in the history of biology. He is an associate professor in the Institute of the History of Medicine at Johns Hopkins University. In 2015, he was appointed the third Baruch S. Blumberg NASA/Library of Congress Chair in Astrobiology at the Library of Congress John W. Kluge Center. He also serves on the advisory council of METI (Messaging Extraterrestrial Intelligence).

Comfort is best known for his 2001 biography of Barbara McClintock, The Tangled Field: Barbara McClintock's Search for the Patterns of Genetic Control. He has been praised for his reinterpretation of the response to McClintock's work on controlling elements.  His 2012 book The Science of Human Perfection examines the history of human and medical genetics in America. He has written about the development of gene editing and its relationship to the United States’ eugenics movement. He is working on a history of the genomic revolution in origin-of-life research.

Education
Comfort received a B.A. in marine biology from the University of California, Berkeley in 1985. He received an M.S. in neurobiology and behavior from Cornell University in 1990. After working as a science writer at Cold Spring Harbor Laboratory, he completed his Ph.D. in history at Stony Brook University in 1997.

Career
Comfort was an associate professor of history and the deputy director at the Center for History of Recent Science at George Washington University from 1997 to 2003. He joined the faculty at Johns Hopkins faculty in 2003.

He is a member of the History of Science Society and the International Society for the History, Philosophy, and Social Studies of Biology. He is on the editorial board of History and Philosophy of the Life Sciences. Comfort published 30 essays and reviews in Nature 2001–2019, and was one of the few authors selected to celebrate the magazine's 150th anniversary.

Personal
Comfort married molecular biologist Carol W. Greider in 1993.  They have two children.  They divorced in 2011.

Publications

References

External links 
 Comfort's faculty profile

1962 births
Living people
20th-century American historians
20th-century American male writers
Johns Hopkins University faculty
George Washington University faculty
21st-century American historians
21st-century American male writers
American male non-fiction writers